Estelnic is a commune in Covasna County, Transylvania, Romania. It became an independent commune when it split from Poian in 2005.
The commune is composed of three villages:
 Cărpinenii / Csángótelep
 Estelnic / Esztelnek
 Valea Scurtă / Kurtapatak

It formed part of the Székely Land region of the historical Transylvania province. Until 1918, the village belonged to the Háromszék County of the Kingdom of Hungary. After the Treaty of Trianon of 1920, it became part of Romania.

Demographics
The commune has an absolute Székely Hungarian majority. According to the 2011 Census it has a population of 1,190  which 97.39% or 1,159 are Hungarian.

References

Communes in Covasna County
Localities in Transylvania